Hycleus phaleratus, is a species of blister beetle found in China, Thailand, Indonesia, Nepal, India, Sri Lanka, and Pakistan.

Description
Body length is about 18 to 25.1 mm. Head with moderately coarse deep and dense punctures. Eyes longer and reniform. Maxillary palpi with triangular apical segment. Pronotum strongly convergent from apical third to apex. Pubescence long, and dense on pronotum. Elytra with moderately coarse, shallow punctures and short pubescence. Basal region consists with two yellowish spots. These spots become rectangular in shape from dorsally and laterally. The median and apical
yellow bands are less undulate. Ventrum moderately and coarsely punctate and shiny. Male has shallowly emarginate sixth visible abdominal sternum, whereas female with entire apex in sixth visible abdominal sternum. Elytral axillary spot convered with black setae. Fore margins of the mesepisterna almost parallel which runs along the median groove. In male, proximal aedeagal hook is closer to the distal one.

In China, the beetle is important commercially in Chinese medicine, due to the ability to biosynthesize potent defensive blistering agent cantharidin.

Adults and grubs are pests on variety of agricultural crops and ornamentals such as: luffa, cowpea, Canna indica, rose, Gossypium hirsutum, green gram, okra, soy bean, tobacco and paddy.

References 

Scarabaeinae
Insects of Sri Lanka
Insects described in 1781